Allahyarlı or Alakhyarly or Allakhyarly may refer to:
Allahyarlı, Beylagan, Azerbaijan
Allahyarlı, Davachi, Azerbaijan
Allahyarlı, Masally, Azerbaijan
Allahyarlı, Siazan, Azerbaijan